Dudu Twito (born 6 February 1994, in Be'er Sheva) is an Israeli footballer who plays for Maccabi Petah Tikva.

Career
He made his debut for Hapoel Be'er Sheva against Maccabi Haifa in May 2014.

Club career statistics
''(correct as of 1 July 2022)

Honours

Club
 Hapoel Beer Sheva
 Israeli Premier League: Runner-up: 2013-14 
 Israeli State Cup: Runner-up: 2014-15 

 Maccabi Petah Tikva
 Toto Cup: 2015–16

 Maccabi Sha'arayim 
 Toto Cup Leumit: 2016–17

References

1994 births
Living people
Israeli footballers
Hapoel Be'er Sheva F.C. players
Maccabi Petah Tikva F.C. players
Maccabi Sha'arayim F.C. players
Hapoel Afula F.C. players
Maccabi Netanya F.C. players
Hapoel Haifa F.C. players
Israeli Premier League players
Liga Leumit players
Israeli people of Algerian-Jewish descent
Footballers from Beersheba
Israel under-21 international footballers
Association football fullbacks